The 1972 United States presidential election in Rhode Island took place on November 7, 1972 as part of the 1972 United States presidential election. Voters chose four representatives, or electors, to the Electoral College, who voted for president and vice president. 

Rhode Island voted for the Republican incumbent, Richard Nixon, over the Democratic challenger, South Dakota Senator George McGovern.  Nixon took 53.00% of the vote to McGovern's 46.81%, a margin of 6.19%. However, this result made Rhode Island about 17% more Democratic than the nation as a whole. This was the first election in 116 years in which Rhode Island did not vote for the same candidate as neighbouring Massachusetts, which has recurred only in 1980.

, this is the last election in which Providence County voted for the Republican candidate, and Nixon won the county by only 186 votes. This was the last presidential election where a Republican presidential candidate was able to win every county in the state of Rhode Island and also the last time a Republican presidential candidate won East Providence and North Providence. 

Rhode Island would go on to vote Republican only once more since this election; in 1984, when Ronald Reagan narrowly won the state.

Results

By county

See also
 United States presidential elections in Rhode Island

References

1972
Rhode Island
1972 Rhode Island elections